Lestes is a genus of damselfly in the family Lestidae.
The family hold their wings at about 45 degrees to the body when resting. This distinguishes them from most other species of damselflies which hold the wings along, and parallel to, the body when at rest.

The name Lestes comes from the Greek word λῃστής (lēistēs) meaning predator.

Extant Species 
The genus Lestes includes the following species:

Fossils
Lestes aquisextana 
Lestes arvernus 
Lestes brisaci 
Lestes ceresti 
Lestes conexus 
Lestes datangensis 
Lestes dianacompteae 
Lestes forsterii 
Lestes irenea 
Lestes leucosia 
Lestes ligea 
Lestes lutzi 
Lestes peisinoe 
Lestes plicata 
Lestes regina 
Lestes sieblosiformis 
Lestes statzi 
Lestes vicina 
Lestes zalesskyi

See also
Chalcolestes

References

External links

 
Lestidae
Zygoptera genera
Odonata of Europe
Odonata of Australia
Odonata of Oceania
Odonata of Africa
Odonata of New Zealand
Odonata of North America
Taxa named by William Elford Leach
Damselflies
Taxonomy articles created by Polbot